Antea LifeStyle Center or simply Antea is a shopping mall in the city of Querétaro, Mexico, which was opened in November 2013.   , Franquicias hoy, 5 July 2011 (Spanish).</ref> Construction began in June 2011 and the mall opened in October 2013 for the first phase, which has a reported cost of $1 billion and will have a total area of 271,000 m2 of construction.

The first phase of the complex feature new to market retailers such as Tory Burch, Chanel, Burberry, Michael Kors, Carolina Herrera, Louis Vuitton, Chico's, Anne Fontaine, Dolce & Gabbana and Crate & Barrel. Dining options include California Pizza Kitchen, PF Changs and Texas de Brazil. The mall will also feature Pink Berry, Zara Home, Pottery Barn, Design Within Reach and a Ferrari – Maserati dealership.

Gallery

References

Buildings and structures in Querétaro
Shopping malls in Mexico
Shopping malls established in 2013
Querétaro City
Lifestyle centers (retail)